is a Japanese record label founded by CyberAgent, the company behind ameba.

The initials CAM mean Cyber Agent Music.

Artists
 Maki Ohguro
 Miyu Nagase
 Maika Sawaki
 Sacon
 Strawberry Record
 Wonder-holic
 Eri Yoshida
 Mistral

See also
 List of record labels
 Avex Group (distributor)

References

External links
 Jei-One

Japanese record labels
Record labels established in 2008
CyberAgent